Corey Alan Elkins (born February 23, 1985) is an American professional ice hockey center who is currently an unrestricted free agent. He was most recently under contract to the Grizzlys Wolfsburg of the Deutsche Eishockey Liga (DEL).

Playing career
Undrafted, Elkins  attended Keith Elementary school in West Bloomfield, Michigan. Elkins played collegiate hockey with Ohio State University of the Central Collegiate Hockey Association before signing an entry-level contract and appearing in 3 NHL games with the Los Angeles Kings of the National Hockey League (NHL)

After just two seasons within the Kings organization, Elkins left for abroad, linking up with HC Pardubice of the Czech Extraliga (ELH).

On July 9, 2012, Elkins signed a one-year, two-way contract with the Anaheim Ducks. During the 2012–13 season, Elkins was assigned to Ducks affiliates. On January 5, 2013, Elkins was granted a mutual release of his contract and returned to Europe in signing for the remainder of the year in Finland with HIFK of the SM-liiga.

Elkins played 5 seasons in the Liiga with HIFK, before concluding his tenure in Finland after the 2016–17 season. As a free agent, Elkins opted to return to North America, agreeing to a one-year AHL contract with the Grand Rapids Griffins on May 2, 2017. In his return to the AHL in the 2017–18 season, Elkins did not miss a game with the Griffins, contributing with 9 goals and 20 points in 76 games.

After a first-round exit in the post-season, Elkins left Grand Rapids as a free agent, agreeing to continue his career in Germany on a one-year contract with Grizzlys Wolfsburg of the DEL on May 14, 2018.  During preparation with the Grizzlys for the 2018–19 campaign, Albert suffered a long-term injury, forcing him out for the entirety of the season.

Career statistics

References

External links

1985 births
Living people
American men's ice hockey centers
Fort Wayne Komets players
HC Dynamo Pardubice players
Grand Rapids Griffins players
HIFK (ice hockey) players
Ice hockey players from Michigan
Los Angeles Kings players
Manchester Monarchs (AHL) players
Norfolk Admirals players
Ohio State Buckeyes men's ice hockey players
People from West Bloomfield, Michigan
St. Louis Heartland Eagles players
Sioux City Musketeers players
Undrafted National Hockey League players
American expatriate ice hockey players in Finland
American expatriate ice hockey players in the Czech Republic
American expatriate ice hockey players in Germany
American expatriate ice hockey players in Norway